Soslan Magometovich Gattsiev (born September 27, 1985 in Andijan, Uzbekistan) is an amateur Belarusian freestyle wrestler of Uzbek origin, who competes in the men's light heavyweight category. Gattsiev represented Belarus at the 2012 Summer Olympics in London, where he competed in the 84 kg class. He lost the semifinal match to Puerto Rico's Jaime Espinal, with a score of 2–15. Gattsiev, however, was offered another shot for the bronze medal bout in the repechage, where he was eventually outclassed and beaten by reigning European champion Dato Marsagishvili of Georgia, with a set-score of 0–3 and 1–3.

References

External links
FILA Profile

Belarusian male sport wrestlers
Uzbekistani male sport wrestlers
1985 births
Living people
Olympic wrestlers of Belarus
Wrestlers at the 2012 Summer Olympics
Sportspeople from Gomel
People from Andijan